Below is the list of programmes being broadcast by RCTI, MNCTV, Global TV, MNC Entertainment, MNC News, MNC Music Channel and also MNC The Indonesian Channel.

News

General news programmes 
 MNC News Morning  - an Indonesian news programme broadcast by MNC News
 MNC News Tonight  - an Indonesian news programme broadcast by MNC News
 MNC News Prime  - an Indonesian news programme broadcast by MNC News
 MNC News Now  - an Indonesian news programme broadcast by MNC News
 Sport Today  - a sport news programme broadcast by MNC Sports
 MNC Today - a news programme broadcast by MNC News in English language, for 30 minutes
 World Headlines  - an international news programme broadcast by MNC News

Local news programmes 
{| class="wikitable"
|-
! News programme
! Channel
! Availability
|-
| Lintas iNews Aceh
| MNCTV
| Banda Aceh
|-
| Lintas iNews Bali
| MNCTV
| Denpasar
|-
| Lintas iNews Banten'''
| MNCTV
| Jabodetabek
|-
| Lintas iNews Batam| MNCTV
| Batam
|-
| Lintas iNews Bengkuku| MNCTV
| Bengkulu
|-
| Lintas iNews Jabar| MNCTV
| Bandung
|-
| Lintas iNews Jateng| MNCTV
| Semarang
|-
| Lintas iNews Jatim| MNCTV
| Surabaya
|-
|Lintas iNews Jogja| MNCTV
| Yogyakarta
|-
| Lintas iNews Lampung| MNCTV
| Lampung
|-
| Lintas iNews Sumbar| MNCTV 
| Padang
|-
|Lintas iNews Sumsel| MNCTV
| Palembang
|-
|Lintas iNews Sumut| MNCTV 
| Medan
|-
| Sekitar Jabar| GTV
| Bandung
|-
| Sekitar Jateng & DIY| GTV
| Semarang, Yogyakarta
|-
| Seputar iNews Jabar| RCTI
| Bandung
|-
| Seputar iNews Jateng| RCTI
| Semarang
|-
| Seputar iNews Yogyakarta| RCTI
| Yogyakarta
|-
| Seputar iNews Jatim| RCTI
| Surabaya
|- 
| Seputar iNews Bali| RCTI
| Denpasar
|-
| Seputar iNews NTB| RCTI
| Mataram
|-
| Seputar iNews NTT| RCTI
| Kupang
|-
| Seputar iNews Aceh| RCTI
| Banda Aceh
|-
| Seputar iNews Bengkulu| RCTI
| Bengkulu
|-
| Seputar iNews Sumut| RCTI
| Medan
|-
| Seputar iNews Sumbar| RCTI
| Padang
|}

 Infotainment 
 Celebrity Stories E-List On Location Selebriti & Asmara Serba 10 VOA Pop News Soap operas 

 MNC Entertainment and MNC The Indonesian Channel 
 Bintang Cerita SMA Diva Do Bee Do Idol Hi Five Jelita Kalo Cinta Jangan Belagu Kasih Munajah Cinta Pernikahan Dini Safira Si Eneng Si Entong RCTI 
 Alisa Lia Rafika Sekar MNCTV 
 Ronaldowati Babak 2 Ucup Santri Feature 
 Benang Merah Di Antara Kita Jendela Lintas Batas Mata Angin Sekitar Kita Recipes 
 Oseng - Oseng Santapan Nusantara Selebriti Masak? Music 
 Aksi Anak Bangsa  Dangdut Mania Dadakan Hits Idola Cilik Indonesian Idol Kontes Dangdut Indonesia Musik Dahsyat Religion 
 Assalamu'alaikum Ustadz Bengkel Hati Bimbingan Rohani Cermin Hati Curcol Al-Habsyi Duet Tausyiah Gang Senggol Hikmah Fajar Majelis Al-Zikra Majelis Sakinah Nikmatnya Sedekah Penyegerakan Rohani Sinaran Hati Sireman Qolbu Talbigh Akbar Wisata Ziarah Comedy 
 Abdel & Temon Check In Check Out Pasar Modal X-Tra Heboh Standard cartoons 
 Crayon Shincan Doraemon Eyeshield 21 Kochikame Tom and Jerry Upin & Ipin Sports 
 ASEAN Football Championship 2023 FIFA Women's World Cup Copa del Rey 2023 AFC U-20 Asian Cup Formula E 2023 Southeast Asian Games Reality shows 

 RCTI 
  Idol Hi Five Kacau Miss Indonesia Satu Lawan Banyak MNCTV
 Bagi - Bagi Modal Grebek Pasar MNCTV It's Showtime Indonesia Mendadak Artis PHK Bukan Kiamat GTV 
 Bedah Rumah Dia Hebat The Dream Girls Let's Dance Pantang Ngemis Uang Kaget Games 
 Deal Or No Deal Indonesia Hole in The Wall Viacom programmes 

 Nickelodeon 
 The Adventures of Jimmy Neutron Avatar: The Legend of Aang The Backyardigans Blue's Clues ChalkZone Dora the Explorer The Fairly OddParents Go Diego Go My Life as a Teenage Robot SpongeBob SquarePants Wonder Pets''

References 

Media Nusantara Citra
Programmes